Frank Williams was an English professional rugby league footballer who played in the 1920s and 1930s.

Playing career

International honours
Williams won a cap for England while at Warrington in 1930 against Other Nationalities.

Championship final appearances
Williams played  in Warrington's 10-22 defeat by Wigan in the Championship Final during the 1925–26 season at Knowsley Road, St. Helens on Saturday 8 May 1926.

County Cup Final appearances
Williams played in Warrington's 15-2 victory over Salford in the 1929 Lancashire County Cup Final during the 1929–30 season at Central Park, Wigan on Saturday 23 November 1929.

Club career
Frank Williams made his début for Warrington on Saturday 12 November 1921, and he played his last match for Warrington on Saturday 24 February 1934.

References

External links
Statistics at wolvesplayers.thisiswarrington.co.uk

England national rugby league team players
English rugby league players
Place of birth missing
Place of death missing
Rugby league locks
Warrington Wolves players
Year of birth missing
Year of death missing